Single Life is a 1985 album by the funk group Cameo. The album reached No. 2 on the Top R&B/Hip-Hop Albums chart and No. 58 on the Billboard Pop Albums chart. It contained the hit singles "Attack Me With Your Love", which reached No. 3 R&B, and the title track, "Single Life", which reached No. 2 R&B (it also reached No. 15 in the UK charts). "Urban Warrior" was the group's foray into the emerging Hip-hop scene. The videos for both singles included appearances from popular television soap opera actors and were tied together by a particular storyline; with the title track’s video being a continuation of the story that started in the "Attack Me With Your Love" video. The album was Cameo’s seventh to be certified Gold by the RIAA for sales of over 500,000 copies.

Track listing

Personnel
 Backing vocals - Charlie Singleton, Larry Blackmon, Michael Burnett, Tomi Jenkins, Nathan Leftenant
 Bass guitar - Barry Johnson, Kevin Kendrick, Larry Blackmon, Michael Burnett
 Drum programmer - Sammy Merendino
 Drums, percussion - Larry Blackmon
 Guitar - Charlie Singleton, Fred Wells, Pat Buchanan
 Keyboards - Eric Rehl, Kevin Kendrick
 Lead vocals - Larry Blackmon, Tomi Jenkins, Barbara Mitchell
 Mixed by - Dave Ogrin, Larry Blackmon
 Producer - Larry Blackmon
 Saxophone (Alto) - Melvin Wells
 Timbales - Roy Leftenant
 Trombone - Keith O'Quinn
 Trumpet - John Gatchell

Charts and certifications

Weekly charts

Year-end charts

Certifications

Singles
"Attack Me With Your Love" - released February 15, 1985
"Single Life" - released June 7, 1985
" A Good-Bye" - released Dec. 1985

References

External links

Cameo (band) albums
1985 albums